WBGN may refer to:
 WBGN (AM), a radio station (1340 AM) licensed to serve Bowling Green, Kentucky, United States
 WEPA-CD, a low-power television station (channel 16, virtual 59) licensed to serve Pittsburgh, Pennsylvania, United States, which held the call sign WBGN-LP, WBGN-LD, or WBGN-CD from 1998 to 2014
 Sematan Airport (ICAO code WBGN)